Life and Technology of the Future was an anthology of Utopian mataerial published in the Soviet Union in 1928. 

The first part consisted of translations and reprints from Plato, Thomas Campanella, Claude Henri de Saint-Simon, Etienne Cabet, Robert Owen, Charles Fourier and Alexander Bogdanov.

The second part consisted of contemporaneous articles by:
 Boris Lobach-Zhuchenko, marine engineer, arrested in July 1927, released 1933 and died of natural causes 1938.

Pavel Blokhin

Alexander Chayanov, an agrarian economist, subsequently arrested first in 1930.

Aleksandr Yakovlevich Orlov, astronomer contributed “Astronomic Utopias” in which he discussed the potential living on Mars and the Moon and provided a  sketch of what he thought an engine for interplanetary travel might look like.

Nikolai Melik-Pashaev

Aron Zalkind (1888–1936), a psychologist. He was accused of "Menshevist-idealistic eclecticism" in 1931. He was later obliged to recant his Freudian views.

References

Russian non-fiction books
1928 in the Soviet Union